The name Top-hat filter refers to several real-space or Fourier space filtering techniques (not to be confused with the top-hat transform). The name top-hat originates from the shape of the filter, which is a rectangle function, when viewed in the domain in which the filter is constructed.

Real space
In real-space the filter performs nearest-neighbour filtering, incorporating components from neighbouring y-function values. However, despite their ease of implementation their practical use is limited as the real-space representation of a top-hat filter is the sinc function, which has the often undesirable effect of incorporating non-local frequencies.

Analogue implementations
Exact non-digital implementations are only theoretically possible. Top-hat filters can be constructed by chaining theoretical low-band and high-band filters. In practice, an approximate top-hat filter can be constructed in analogue hardware using approximate low-band and high-band filters.

Fourier space
In Fourier space, a top hat filter selects a band of signal of desired frequency by the specification of a lower and upper bounding frequencies.  Top-hat filters are particularly easy to implement digitally.

Related functions 
The top hat function can be generated by differentiating a linear ramp function of width . The limit of  then becomes the Dirac delta function. Its real-space form is the same as the moving average, with the exception of not introducing a shift in the output function.

See also
 Boxcar averager
 Rectangular function
 Step function
 Boxcar function

References

Linear filters